Canada is divided into 10 provinces and three territories. The majority of Canada's population is concentrated in the areas close to the Canada–US border. Its four largest provinces by area (Ontario, Quebec, British Columbia, and Alberta) are also its most populous; together they account for 86.5% of the country's population. The territories (the Northwest Territories, Nunavut, and Yukon) account for over a third of Canada's area but are home to only 0.32% of its population, which skews the national population density value.

Canada's population grew by 5.24% between the 2016 and 2021 censuses. With the exceptions of Newfoundland and Labrador and the Northwest Territories, all territories and provinces increased in population from 2016 to 2021. In terms of percent change, the fastest-growing province or territory was Yukon with an increase of 12.1% between 2016 and 2021, followed by Prince Edward Island with 7.99% growth.

Generally, provinces steadily grew in population along with Canada. However, some provinces such as Saskatchewan, Prince Edward Island, and Newfoundland and Labrador experienced long periods of stagnation or population decline. Ontario and Quebec were always the two most populous provinces in Canada, with over 60% of the population at any given time. The demographic importance of the West steadily grew over time, while the importance of Atlantic Canada steadily slipped.
Canada's population has increased every year since Confederation in 1867: see List of population of Canada by year.

Population
<onlyinclude>

Population growth rate

Current provinces and territories population growth rate are based on the Statistics Canada 2021 Census of Population.

Demographic evolution

Historical population

The population of Canada increased every year since Confederation in 1867. The first national census of the country was taken in 1871, and it covered the four provinces which were part of Canada at the time. It recorded a population of 1,620,851 in Ontario, 1,191,516 in Quebec, 387,800 in Nova Scotia and 285,594 in New Brunswick The population of each of these provinces continued to grow every year uninterrupted. However, their growth was slow in the late 19th century because there were few economic opportunities. As a result, many Canadians opted to emigrate in the United States for work. 

This phenomenon hit Quebec especially hard. Approximately 900,000 Quebec residents (French Canadian for the great majority) left for the United States between 1840 and 1930. However, Quebec's population losses to emigration during this period were largely offset by its natural population growth. Indeed, until the middle of the 20th century, Quebec had a birth rate considerably higher than most of its contemporary industrialized societies. This period of high French-Canadian population growth is nicknamed .

Population growth in the Northwest Territories, and then the Western Provinces, picked up when the Canadian government passed the Dominion Lands Act in 1872 to encourage the settlement of the Canadian Prairies, and to help prevent the area from being claimed by the United States. The act gave a claimant  for free, the only cost to the farmer being a $10 administration fee. Any male farmer who was at least 21 years of age and agreed to cultivate at least  of the land and build a permanent dwelling on it (within three years) qualified. The population of the Canadian prairies grew rapidly in the last decade of the 19th century, and the population of Saskatchewan quintupled from 91,000 in 1901 to 492,000 in 1911. The vast majority of these people were immigrants from Europe.

Early counts of Northwest Territories' population tend to exclude the Indigenous citizens of the nations whose countries comprised the territory, such as the Dene of Denendeh or Inuit of Inuit Nunangat. The territory's population drops at the turn of the 20th and 21st centuries are due to its reduction in size, as Yukon, then Saskatchewan and Alberta were carved out of its territory, and the same with Nunavut a century later. Yukon's population spike at the turn of the 20th century is due to the Klondike Gold Rush, when an estimated 100,000 people tried to reach the Klondike goldfields between 1896 and 1899, of whom only around 30,000 to 40,000 eventually did.

Generally, provinces steadily grew in population along with Canada. However, some provinces experienced long periods of stagnation or population decline. After peaking in 1891, Prince Edward Island's population started to decline every year until 1941, after which the province started growing again. In Saskatchewan, after a rapid population explosion at the beginning of the century that propelled the province to being the 3rd largest in the country, its population declined during the Great Depression, and its growth had been slow ever since. From 1931 to 2016, Saskatchewan's population increased by only 19.2%, well below the national average. Newfoundland and Labrador, on the other hand, experienced slow but continuous growth until the 1990s, when the cod fisheries collapsed, and their population started to fall.

After the collapse of the Canadian birth rate, most provinces now sustain their population with immigration from the developing world. The number of new immigrants increases every year.

Demographic weight of provinces and territories

The demographic weight of each province in Canada has always constituted a sensitive issue. In 1840, the Durham Report recommended that Upper Canada (now Ontario) and Lower Canada (now Quebec) be united into one province. The newly created Legislative Assembly of the Province of Canada was required to have equal representation from Canada East (now Quebec) and Canada West (now Ontario), even though the population of Canada East was considerably larger. In 1840, the population of Canada East was estimated at 670,000, while the population of Canada West was estimated to be 480,000.  Lord Durham had not recommended this approach, and had instead proposed that the representation should be based on the respective populations of the two regions. The British government rejected that recommendation and instead implemented sectional equality, apparently to give the English-speaking population of the new province a dominant voice in the provincial government.

However, the 1851 census revealed that Canada West's population had surpassed Canada East's. This fact fuelled demands in Canada West for the end of sectional equality and the move toward allocating seats in the legislation on the basis of population, nicknamed "rep by pop". This was a hotly contested issues at the constitutional conferences leading up to confederation, and the colonies reached a comprise in which the seats in the federal lower house (House of commons) would be allocated by population, and the seats in the federal upper house (Senate) would be allocated on the basis of three defined regionsOntario, Quebec and the Maritimesthat would each have 24 seats.

Since Confederation, Ontario and Quebec were always Canada's two most populous provinces. However, their combined demographic weight decreased from over 80% at Confederation to just over 60% in 2016. The Atlantic provinces also lost importance within Canada, from around 20% at Confederation to under 7% today. The West's importance, however, has only increased, from insignificant levels in 1871 to over 30% of the country in 2016. In the first half of the 20th century, the most populous western province was Saskatchewan, but its population was later eclipsed by British Columbia, Alberta, and Manitoba.

The issue of the demographic weight of each provinces came up during the negotiations for the Patriation of the Constitution, and especially discussions around the amending formula of the constitution. The final formula stipulates that minor changes to the constitution had to be approved by the Parliament of Canada and the Legislature of 7 provinces representing at least 50% of the Canadian population. This essentially meant that either Ontario or Quebec had to agree to any constitutional amendments that affect all provinces.

Quebec had managed to maintain a stable demographic weight within to Canada during the first half of the 20th century due to its high birth rate. However, their importance began to slip as their birth rate started to fall in the 1960s. Quebec wanted to make it up through immigration, and for this purpose created its Ministry of Immigration in 1968, and negotiated for increased powers in this field with the federal government. However, new immigrants to Canada disproportionally go the Ontario, British Columbia and Alberta, fuelling their rise in demographic weight. In response, a Canada–Québec Accord was concluded in 1991 which, among other things, guaranteed Quebec an immigration rate proportional to its demographic weight in Canada. This provision was not fulfilled, as in 2005, immigration to Quebec represented only 16.5% of all immigration to Canada. 

Quebec also attempted to maintain its weight within the Canadian House of Commons during the constitutional negotiations of the early 1990s. Under the Charlottetown Accord, in exchange for Quebec losing Senate seats under a Triple-E Senate (dropping from 24 to 6), Quebec was guaranteed never to be allotted less than 25% of the seats in the House of Commons. The Accord was ultimately defeated in a public referendum.

Historical demographic weight of provinces and territories

See also 

Population of Canada
List of Canadian provinces and territories by historical population
List of the largest cities and towns in Canada by area
List of the largest municipalities in Canada by population
List of the largest population centres in Canada
List of largest Canadian cities by census
Interprovincial migration in Canada

References 

Population
Canada, population
Canada, population